NA-66 Sialkot-I is a constituency for the National Assembly of Pakistan. It mainly comprises the non-urban portion of Sialkot Tehsil.

Members of Parliament

2018-2022: NA-72 Sialkot-I

Election 2002 

General elections were held on 10 Oct 2002. Chaudhry Amir Hussain of PML-Q won by 52,378 votes.

Election 2008 

Dr. Firdos Ashiq Awan, the PPP candidate, won the seat in 2008, and went on to hold several cabinet portfolios during the PPP government.

General elections were held on 18 Feb 2008. Firdous Ashiq Awan of PPP won by 78,925 votes.
On the other hand, Ch.Amir Hussain of Pakistan Muslim League secured 46372

Election 2013 

General elections were held on 11 May 2013. Chaudry Armaghan Subhani of PML-N won by 137,474 votes and became the member of National Assembly.

Election 2018 
General elections were held on 25 July 2018.

See also
NA-65 Gujrat-IV
NA-67 Sialkot-II

References

External links 
Election result's official website
Delimitation 2018 official website Election Commission of Pakistan

72
72